is a tower defense game developed and published by ArtePiazza in Japan on November 24, 2010 for the Nintendo DSi.

References

External links
 

2010 video games
DSiWare games
Japan-exclusive video games
Nintendo DS-only games
Nintendo DS games
Tower defense video games
Video games developed in Japan
Video games scored by Hayato Matsuo